Siah Karbon (also Romanized as Sīāh Kārbon; also known as Sīāh Gārbon, Sīāh Kārbun, and Siakh-Karbun) is a village in Deylaman Rural District, Deylaman District, Siahkal County, Gilan Province, Iran. At the 2006 census, its population was 83, in 21 families.

References 

Populated places in Siahkal County